The 2015 Memorial Cup (branded as the 2015 Mastercard Memorial Cup for sponsorship reasons) was a four-team round-robin format tournament that began on 22 May and ended on 31 May, 2015. It was the 97th Memorial Cup championship and determined the champion of the Canadian Hockey League (CHL). The tournament was hosted by the Quebec Remparts of Quebec City, Quebec, who won the right to host the tournament over a bid by the Chicoutimi Saguenéens. They were joined by the WHL champion Kelowna Rockets, the OHL champion Oshawa Generals, and the QMJHL champion Rimouski Océanic.

Since the inclusion of the host team in the Memorial Cup format in 1983, the 2015 edition of the Memorial Cup is the only tournament in which all four of the participating teams had previously won the Memorial Cup. The Oshawa Generals won four in 1939, 1940, 1944 & 1990, the Quebec Remparts won two in 1971 & 2006, the Kelowna Rockets won in 2004, and the Rimouski Océanic won in 2000.

The tournament ended with the Oshawa Generals winning their fifth Memorial Cup with an overtime win over the Kelowna Rockets 2–1 in the championship game. This final game of the tournament was also the last competitive hockey game played in the Colisée Pepsi before the Remparts move to the Videotron Centre in September 2015.

Round-robin standings

Kelowna, Rimouski, and Quebec finished tied for second in points. Based on the rules for 2015, the tiebreaker was a two-step process.  Results from the games against Oshawa were removed and the teams' remaining goals for, divided by the sum of their goals for plus goals against, were calculated. This resulted in Kelowna (10/[10+7]=0.59) advancing directly to the semi-final (and receiving home ice advantage). In the second step, Quebec defeated Rimouski in a sudden-death tiebreaker game to advance to the semi-final.

Schedule
All times local (UTC −5)

Round robin

Playoff round

Tiebreaker

Semi-final

Final

Statistical leaders

Skaters

GP = Games played; G = Goals; A = Assists; Pts = Points; PIM = Penalty minutes

Goaltending

This is a combined table of the top goaltenders based on goals against average and save percentage with at least sixty minutes played. The table is sorted by GAA.

GP = Games played; W = Wins; L = Losses; SA = Shots against; GA = Goals against; GAA = Goals against average; SV% = Save percentage; SO = Shutouts; TOI = Time on ice (minutes:seconds)

Awards
 Stafford Smythe Memorial Trophy (MVP): Leon Draisaitl, Kelowna Rockets
 Ed Chynoweth Trophy (Leading Scorer): Leon Draisaitl, Kelowna Rockets
 George Parsons Trophy (Sportsmanlike): Alexis Loiseau, Rimouski Océanic
 Hap Emms Memorial Trophy (Top Goalie): Ken Appleby, Oshawa Generals
 All-Star Team:
Goaltender: Ken Appleby, Oshawa Generals
Defence: Madison Bowey, Kelowna Rockets; Ryan Graves, Quebec Remparts
Forwards: Nick Merkley, Kelowna Rockets; Michael McCarron, Oshawa Generals; Michael Dal Colle, Oshawa Generals

Rosters

Quebec Remparts (Host)
Head coach: Philippe Boucher

Rimouski Océanic (QMJHL)
 Head coach: Serge Beausoleil

Kelowna Rockets (WHL)
 Head coach:  Dan Lambert

Oshawa Generals (OHL)
 Head coach: D. J. Smith

Road to the Cup

WHL Playoffs

OHL Playoffs

QMJHL Playoffs

References

External links
 Memorial Cup
 Canadian Hockey League

Memorial Cup tournaments
Memorial Cup
Memorial Cup
2015 in Quebec
2010s in Quebec City